C. T. Dhandapani (March 19, 1933 – October 28, 2001) was an Indian politician and former Member of Parliament elected from Tamil Nadu. He was elected to the Lok Sabha from Dharapuram constituency as a Dravida Munnetra Kazhagam candidate in 1967, 1971 and 1980 elections.

He also served as the Member of the Legislative Assembly of Tamil Nadu. He was elected to the Tamil Nadu legislative assembly as a Dravida Munnetra Kazhagam candidate from Coimbatore West constituency in 1996 election.

References 

Dravida Munnetra Kazhagam politicians
India MPs 1967–1970
India MPs 1971–1977
India MPs 1980–1984
Lok Sabha members from Tamil Nadu
Tamil Nadu MLAs 1996–2001
People from Coimbatore district
1933 births
2001 deaths